Likskär may refer to:

 Likskär, Kalix, an island and nature reserve in the Kalix Archipelago of Sweden
 Likskär, Luleå, an island in the Luleå archipelago of Sweden, joined to the island of Altappen